Roberto Cesar Peña (April 17, 1937 – July 23, 1982) was a Dominican professional baseball shortstop, who played in Major League Baseball (MLB) for the Chicago Cubs (1965–66), Philadelphia Phillies (1968), San Diego Padres (1969), Oakland Athletics (1970), and Milwaukee Brewers (1970–71). He represented the Dominican Republic at the 1959 Pan American Games, in Chicago.

References

External links

Roberto Peña at Pura Pelota (Venezuelan Professional Baseball League)

1937 births
1982 deaths
Accidental deaths in the Dominican Republic
Águilas Cibaeñas players
Alcohol-related deaths in the Dominican Republic
Alijadores de Tampico players
Asheville Tourists players
Baseball players at the 1959 Pan American Games
Burlington Bees players
Chicago Cubs players
Columbus Jets players
Dallas–Fort Worth Spurs players
Dominican Republic expatriate baseball players in Mexico
Dominican Republic expatriate baseball players in the United States
Estibadores de Tampico players
Estrellas Orientales players
Hobbs Pirates players
Kinston Eagles players
Leones de Yucatán players
Major League Baseball players from the Dominican Republic
Major League Baseball shortstops
Mexican League baseball players
Milwaukee Brewers players
Milwaukee Brewers scouts
Oakland Athletics players
Pan American Games competitors for the Dominican Republic
Philadelphia Phillies players
San Diego Padres players
San Diego Padres (minor league) players
Sportspeople from Santo Domingo
Tacoma Cubs players
Tigres de Aragua players
Dominican Republic expatriate baseball players in Venezuela